= Lucia Quachey =

Ghanaian entrepreneur and business advocate

Lucia Quachey is a Ghanaian entrepreneur and business advocate who served as President of Business and Professional Women in Ghana. She has worked in several organizations that promote women’s entrepreneurship, business development, and regional cooperation in West Africa.

== Early life and education ==
Lucia Quachey attended Holy Child Secondary School in Calabar, where she studied fashion design and business administration at the O-level from 1960 to 1964.

== Career ==
Quachey is active in business leadership and women’s entrepreneurship initiatives in Ghana. She held leadership positions in several regional and national organizations focused on supporting women in business. She served as President of Business and Professional Women, an international organization that promotes the professional and economic empowerment of women.

Quachey was involved with the ECOWAS Federation of Business and Professional Women, where she contributed to initiatives aimed at strengthening cooperation among women entrepreneurs within the Economic Community of West African States. In addition, she worked with the Ghana Association of Women Entrepreneurs and the African Federation of Women Entrepreneurs, organizations that promote women’s participation in business and enterprise development. Quachey was also associated with Lucia Manufacturing Industry Ltd., a business involved in manufacturing activities in Ghana.

== Professional focus ==
Throughout her career, Quachey worked on initiatives related to entrepreneurship development, women’s economic empowerment, and regional cooperation among women-led businesses. Her professional activities include event organization, business strategy development, and leadership in professional associations.
